Zachary Williams (born December 27, 1988) is a former American football center. He was drafted by the Carolina Panthers in the sixth round of the 2011 NFL Draft. He played college football at Washington State.

On February 18, 2014, Williams was assigned to the Orlando Predators of the Arena Football League.

On January 30, 2015, Williams was traded to the Las Vegas Outlaws for Claim Order Position.

On November 9, 2015, Williams was assigned to the Arizona Rattlers. He was placed on reassignment on February 22, 2016.

On March 21, 2016, Williams was assigned to the Los Angeles KISS. On March 30, 2016, Williams was placed on recallable reassignment.

References

External links
Washington State Cougars bio

1988 births
Living people
Players of American football from Pasadena, California
American football centers
Washington State Cougars football players
Carolina Panthers players
Orlando Predators players
Las Vegas Outlaws (arena football) players
Arizona Rattlers players
Los Angeles Kiss players
Pasadena High School (California) alumni